Nutrient density identifies the amount of beneficial nutrients in a food product in proportion to e.g. energy content, weight or amount of perceived detrimental nutrients. Terms such as nutrient rich and  micronutrient dense refer to similar properties.
Several different national and international standards have been developed and are in use (see Nutritional rating systems).

Definition and usage
According to the World Health Organization, nutrient profiling classifies and/or ranks foods by their nutritional composition in order to promote human (and/or animal) health and to prevent disease.  Ranking by nutrient density is one such nutrient profiling strategy.  Ordering foods by nutrient density is a statistical method of comparing foods by the proportion of nutrients in foods.  Some such comparisons can be the glycemic index and the overall nutritional quality index.

When the density is defined in proportion to energy contents, nutrient-dense foods such as fruits and vegetables are the opposite of energy-dense food (also called "empty calorie" food), such as alcohol and foods high in added sugar or processed cereals. Beyond its use to distinguish different types of food from each other, nutrient density allows comparison to be made for different examples or samples of the same kind of food. Nutrient density is correlated with soil quality and mineralization levels of the soil, although the relationship is complex and incorporates other dimensions.

The Academy of Nutrition and Dietetics reported in 2013 that:
Several indicators of nutrient quality have been summarized by the Academy.

The Nutrient Rich Food Index has been developed by a research coalition involving food and nutrition practitioners.  This index uses nutrient profiles that have been validated against accepted measures of a healthy diet, such as the Healthy Eating Index created by the USDA.

International standards

The Nutrient Profiling Scoring Calculator (NPSC) in Australia and New Zealand is a calculator for determining whether health claims can be made for a food by its reference to the Nutrient Profiling Scoring Criterion (NPSC).  It is defined by the FSANZ Board, which operates under the FSANZ Act.

The United Kingdom Ofcom nutrient profiling model provides "a single score for any given food product, based on calculating the number of points for ‘negative’ nutrients which can be offset by points for ‘positive’ nutrients."  A 2007 UK-commissioned review of nutrient profiling models commissioned by the UK Food Standards Agency identified over 40 different schemes.

The World Health Organization reviews scientific and operational issues related to human nutrition, specifically when developing world populations are impacted.

Criticism
The following aspects of nutrient density measures have been criticized.

Measuring in proportion to energy content
If nutrient density is measured in proportion to the food's energy content:
 By design, it premiers micronutrients over macronutrients, since most macronutrients contribute to food energy content (and thereby decrease the density measure).
 A food product with excellent micronutrient content may get a very low nutrient density, if it also has significant energy content, even if that energy is provided by healthy macronutrients like essential amino acids, unsaturated fats and slow carbohydrates.
 A food product with very low energy content may get a very high density, even if its actual micronutrient content is low.
 Focusing on low-energy food may create or trigger already existing eating disorders.

Using a single measure for multiple nutrients
No natural food product contains all essential nutrients and nutrient density will not tell you which ones are missing. So even a diet based on a lot of high-density products could still lack several essential nutrients.

Choice of nutrients included in the measure
  If all essential nutrient or micronutrients are included in the measure, it will remove focus from the nutrients that are most often lacking in people's diets.
 If a selection of nutrients is made (e.g. based on how often they are lacking in people's diets), the selection will not be relevant to everyone, because some people lack completely different nutrients.

See also

Bioavailability
Concentration, abundance of a constituent divided by total volume of mixture
Diet
Food composition
Glycemic index
List of micronutrients
List of phytochemicals in food
Macronutrients, chemical substances humans consume in largest quantities
Nutrient
Nutrition
Nutritionism, reductionist theory that scientifically identified nutrients in foods determine value of individual foodstuffs in human diet, often leading to targeted supplementation rather than reliance on whole foods
Overall nutritional quality index
Mineralization (soil science)

References

External References
 

 Cason, K. L., Clemson University Department of Food Science and Human Nutrition. Nutrient Density (Consumer Judging—Junior/Senior). February 2005.
 Dooley, D. A. Island Scene Online. Nutrient Density: An Idea Whose Time Has Finally Come. (Hawaii Medical Service Association), July 27, 2005. http://www.islandscene.com/Article.aspx?id=2641, accessed 10/15/2014.

 

 University of Wisconsin Cooperative Extension. Nutrient Density: Optimize Your Intake!

Nutrition
Dietetics